A.C. Waltman House, also known as Carl Adams House, is a historic home located at La Grange, Lewis County, Missouri. It was built about 1853, and is a -story, three bay, massed plan, brick dwelling with Greek Revival / Italianate style design elements.  It has a one-story frame rear ell. It features a flattened gable roof and a full-width front porch supported by tapered, fluted Doric order columns.

It was listed on the National Register of Historic Places in 1999.

References

Houses on the National Register of Historic Places in Missouri
Greek Revival houses in Missouri
Italianate architecture in Missouri
Houses completed in 1853
Buildings and structures in Lewis County, Missouri
National Register of Historic Places in Lewis County, Missouri